Adèle Dumont d'Urville (née Adèle Dorothée Pépin, also spelled as  Adélie , 1798 – 8 May 1842) was the wife of French explorer Jules Dumont d'Urville, after whom Adélie Land, Adele Island, Adélie penguin and Cape Pepin are named. While Adélie Land, Adele Island and Cape Pepin were named by Jules Dumont d'Urville in honor of his wife, the penguin was named after Adélie Land where it was discovered. In 1981, an airmail postage stamp of the French Antarctic Territory featuring Adèle Dumont d'Urville was released.

Life
Adèle Dumont d'Urville was born in the family of watchmaker Joseph Marie Pépin. She met her future husband in Pépin's shop, which Dumont d'Urville visited several times. She married Dumont d'Urville on 1 May 1815 in Toulon. The ceremony was quiet, with a few guests from both sides. They had at least four children from the marriage, but none survived to adulthood. Adèle later bought a bastide with a garden outside Toulon. She died with her husband and son Jules in a derailment at Meudon. They are buried at Montparnasse Cemetery. The French National Archives contain letters of Adèle Dumont d'Urville.

References

18th-century French women
19th-century French women
1798 births
1842 deaths
Railway accident deaths in France
Burials at Montparnasse Cemetery